The 2019–20 season was Bangladesh Police Football Club's 48th season since its establishment in 1972 and their first-ever season in the top flight, Bangladesh Premier League.

On 16 March 2020, All sorts of sports activities in Bangladesh were postponed until March 31 as a precaution to combat the spread of coronavirus in the country, according to a press release issued by the Ministry of Youth and Sports. Following that, Bangladesh Football Federation (BFF) postponed all Bangladesh Premier League matches until March 31.

On 17 May 2020, The BFF executive committee, following an emergency meeting, declared the 12th edition of the league abandoned, scrapping promotion and relegation while cancelling the Independence Cup from the calendar.

Summary

Pre-season
After promoting to the top-tier league, Police FC announced Nicolas Vitorovic as their head coach for upcoming season on August. They signed Antonio Laskov, Luka Rotkovic, Aidar Mambetaliev, former Kyrgyzstan international Artur Muladjanov & Victor Onyilo to fill up foreign quota. However, Victor was replaced by Puerto Rico national team captain Sidney Rivera. They also signed Bangladesh origin American footballer Sanjay Karim, which made headlines. He practiced with the team for 2 months but couldn't play in domestic leagues & cups as he doesn't have ITC. So his contract was terminated in January 2019.

Police FC played 4 friendlies in October & November. Police FC participated in a pre-season tournament Mymensingh DFA Challenge Cup, along with Saif SC & Chittagong Abahani. The first game was won in tie-breaker against Chittagong Abahani. The second game also won against Saif SC in tie-breaker & Police FC qualified for the final. The final match was lost by 1–0 against Chittagong Abahani & ended the pre-season with runners-up medal.

December
Police FC started 2019–20 season on 18 December. They played their first Federation Cup game in 30 years. The match was lost by 4–0 against Dhaka Abahani. However, the second game was won by 3–1 against Arambagh KS on 21 December & qualified for quarterfinal. Sidney scored a brace & Shadin scored other in added time. In quarterfinal, Police FC faced Saif SC on 31 December. The match was also won by 3–1. Sidney scored a back to back brace when Bablu scored other. Police FC qualified for the first-ever semi-final of their history.

January
On 3 January, the Federation Cup semi-final was lost by 3–0 against defending runners-up Bashundhara Kings. Thus, the Federation Cup campaign of Police FC ended.

February
On 16 February, Police FC started their first BPL season against defending runners-up Dhaka Abahani. The match was lost by 2–0. On 20 February, Police FC held defending champion Bashundhara Kings by 1-1.  Nurul Faisal of Bashundhara scored an own goal. Police faced another newly promoted team Uttar Baridhara on 24 February. Police FC won the match by 2-1 & grabbed their first victory as Sidney & Laskov found the net.

March
Police FC were held by Brother Union on 6 march. Bablu scored the goal for Police & the natch ended in 1-1. On 13 March, Police FC tested second defeat against Rahmatganj MFS by 2–0.

The other matches of the month were postponed due to COVID-19 pandemic .

Pre-season and friendlies

Current squad
Bangladesh Police FC squad for 2019–20 season.

Competition

Overview

Federation Cup

Group A

Knockout stage

Premier League

League table

Results summary

Results by round

Matches

References

Bangladesh Championship League seasons
2019–20 in Asian association football leagues
2020 in Bangladeshi football
2019 in Bangladeshi football